The 1973 Kentucky Wildcats football team was an American football team that represented the University of Kentucky in the Southeastern Conference (SEC) during the 1973 NCAA Division I football season. In their first season under head coach Fran Curci, the Wildcats compiled a 5–6 record (3–4 against conference opponents) and finished in a three-way tie for fifth place in the SEC. 

This was Kentucky's first season playing at Commonwealth Stadium. The Wildcats christened the facility with a 31-26 victory vs. Virginia Tech in their season opener. 

The team's statistical leaders included Sonny Collins with 1,213 rushing yards and 78 points scored, Mike Fanuzzi with 572 passing yards, and Elmore Stephens with 282 receiving yards. Three Kentucky players received first-team honors from the Associated Press (AP) and/or United Press International (UPI) on the 1973 All-SEC football team: Sonny Collins (AP, UPI); and end Jim McCollum (UPI); defensive back Darryl Bishop (UPI).

Schedule

Roster
 Sonny Collins, running back, sophomore

References

Kentucky
Kentucky Wildcats football seasons
Kentucky Wildcats football